Surkanda Devi is a Hindu temple near Kanatal, Uttarakhand, India.  It is at an altitude of about 2756 metres lies close to nearby hill stations of Dhanaulti and Chamba walking distance of approx  from Kaddukhal, the place where vehicles are parked.

It is surrounded by dense forests and affords a scenic view of the surrounding region including the Himalayas to the north, and certain cities to the south (e.g., Dehradun, Rishikesh) The Ganga Dusshera festival is celebrated every year between May and June and attracts a lot of people. This is a temple which is situated among the trees of rounslii. It is covered with fog most of the time of the year.

Legend
One of the most persistent history concerning the origin of worship at the site is associated with the legend of Sati, who was the wife of the ascetic god Shiva and daughter of the Puranic god-king Daksha. Daksha was unhappy with his daughter's choice of husband, and when he performed a grand Vedic sacrifice for all the deities, he did not invite Shiva or Sati. In a rage, Sati threw herself onto the fire, knowing that this would make the sacrifice impure. Because she was the all-powerful mother goddess, Sati left her body in that moment to be reborn as the goddess Parvati. Meanwhile, Shiva was stricken with grief and rage at the loss of his wife. He put Sati's body over his shoulder and began his tandava (dance of cosmic destruction) throughout the heavens, and vowed not to stop until the body was completely rotted away. The other Gods, afraid of their annihilation, implored Vishnu to pacify Shiva. Thus, wherever Shiva wandered while dancing, Vishnu followed. He sent his discus Sudarshana to destroy the corpse of Sati. Pieces of her body fell until Shiva was left without a body to carry. Seeing this, Shiva sat down to do Mahatapasya (great penance). Despite the similarity in name, scholars do not generally believe that this legend gave rise to the practice of sati, or widow burning.
According to various myths and traditions, there are 51 pieces of Sati's body scattered across the Indian subcontinent. These places are called shakti peethas and are dedicated to various powerful goddesses. When Shiva was passing over this place on his way back to Kailash carrying Sati's body, her head fell at the spot where the modern temple of Sarkunda Devi or Surkhanda Devi stands and due to which the temple's got its name as sirkhanda which in the passage of time is now called sarkunda.

Reaching there
The spot is daytrip from Dehradun, Mussoorie, or Landour.  The temple is located on a hill, and one reaches there after a steep 3km trek from village Kaddukhal, on the Dhanaulti - Chamba road.  A new ropeway (inaugurated in May 2022) cuts this trek to an easy 10-minute ride.

References

External links 

Surkanda Devi at  website
Surkanda Devi Temple at wikimapia/

Hindu temples in Uttarakhand
Tehri Garhwal district